Anton Watson (born October 6, 2000) is an American college basketball player for the Gonzaga Bulldogs of the West Coast Conference (WCC).

High school career
Watson played varsity basketball for four years at Gonzaga Preparatory School in Spokane, Washington. In his sophomore season, he averaged 19 points per game and was named most valuable player (MVP) of the Greater Spokane League. Watson led his team to a league championship and a third-place finish at the Washington Class 4A state tournament. As a junior, he averaged 23 points, 11 rebounds and five assists per game and won the Class 4A state title while earning tournament MVP honors. Watson was selected to the USA Today All-USA Washington first team. In his senior season, he averaged 21.6 points, 7.1 rebounds and 3.8 assists per game, helped Gonzaga Prep win a second consecutive 4A state championship. He was the unanimous MVP of the state tournament and recognized as Associated Press 4A Player of the Year and Washington Mr. Basketball. On June 21, 2017, before his junior season, Watson committed to play college basketball for Gonzaga. He had also been in contact with Idaho, Washington and Washington State. Watson was considered a four-star recruit and the second-best player in the 2019 class from Washington.

College career
On November 5, 2019, Watson debuted for Gonzaga, recording seven points, five rebounds and four assists in a win over Alabama State. He had 15 points in a win over North Dakota on November 12. Watson started four games with Killian Tillie recovering from knee surgery. On January 16, 2020, it was announced that Watson would undergo shoulder surgery and miss the remainder of the season. He averaged 4.9 points and 3.1 rebounds in 15 games.

Career statistics

College

|-
| style="text-align:left;"| 2019–20
| style="text-align:left;"| Gonzaga
| 15 || 5 || 14.7 || .538 || .111 || .571 || 3.1 || 1.5 || 1.2 || .5 || 4.9
|-
| style="text-align:left;"| 2020–21
| style="text-align:left;"| Gonzaga
| 32 || 17 || 18.9 || .631 || .150 || .650 || 3.3 || 1.2 || 1.2 || .6 || 6.9
|-
| style="text-align:left;"| 2021–22
| style="text-align:left;"| Gonzaga
| 32 || 0 || 18.1 || .538 || .227 || .698 || 4.7 || 1.9 || 1.3 || .3 || 7.3
|- class="sortbottom"
| style="text-align:center;" colspan="2"| Career
| 79 || 22 || 17.8 || .575 || .176 || .661 || 3.8 || 1.5 || 1.2 || .5 || 6.7

Personal life
Watson's father, Deon Sr., played college basketball at Idaho (1990–94), holds the Vandal record for  career rebounds (877), and played professionally in Europe and South America. Older brother Deon Jr. played college football at their father's alma mater (2013–16) as a tight end and wide receiver, and sister Haile played volleyball at Eastern Washington (2015) and Fresno State (2016–18).

References

External links
Gonzaga Bulldogs bio

Living people
2000 births
Gonzaga Bulldogs men's basketball players
Gonzaga Preparatory School alumni
People from Coeur d'Alene, Idaho
Basketball players from Idaho
Basketball players from Spokane, Washington
Small forwards